Thrincopyge is a genus of "jewel beetles" in the subfamily Polycestinae, containing the following species:

 Thrincopyge alacris LeConte, 1858
 Thrincopyge ambiens (LeConte, 1854)
 Thrincopyge marginata Waterhouse, 1890

References

Buprestidae genera